"The Last Song" is a song by English musician Elton John, released as the third single from his 23rd studio album, The One (1992). It was composed by John, with lyrics provided by Bernie Taupin. The song marked the first of John's American singles to benefit his AIDS foundation. It reached  7 in Canada and No. 21 in the United Kingdom while peaking within the top 40 in several countries worldwide, including Australia, Ireland, New Zealand, and the United States.

Background
John's lyricist, Bernie Taupin, faxed the lyrics to him in Paris, shortly after Queen lead singer Freddie Mercury had died the previous year. He said: "I was crying all the time as I wrote the music", John told The Advocate, "and  it was very hard for me to sing it". Taupin went on to explain:

"We didn't go for the obvious. I tried to do something lyrically that would thaw the intolerance of not understanding. That's why I used the idea of a father coming to terms with his son's status in life and his sexuality, but unfortunately understanding too late. If you can melt a little intolerance along the way, I'm happy with that."

Originally titled "Song for 1992", it was renamed to avoid dating it.

Music video
A music video, directed by Gus Van Sant, was made for the song, but he was not the first director considered; David Hockney and Madonna had previously declined the offer.

Personnel
 Elton John – piano, vocals
 Guy Babylon – keyboards

Charts

Weekly charts

Year-end charts

Release history

In popular culture
"The Last Song" was used during a closing montage at the end of the 1993 film And the Band Played On, which featured images of notable people who had contracted AIDS. It has also been mentioned numerous times on The Howard Stern Show; whose producer Gary Dell'Abate said that the song and music video reminded him of his brother, who died of AIDS around the time The One was released. When they first played the song on the air, Dell'Abate broke out in tears during the first verse.

See also
 "Gone Too Soon", a song by Michael Jackson, dedicated to Ryan White.

References

1992 singles
1992 songs
Elton John songs
LGBT-related songs
MCA Records singles
The Rocket Record Company singles
Song recordings produced by Chris Thomas (record producer)
Songs about HIV/AIDS
Songs with lyrics by Bernie Taupin
Songs with music by Elton John